KYGR (88.1 FM) was a radio station licensed to Alamo, New Mexico, United States. The station was owned by Alamo Navajo School Board.

Alamo Navajo School Board surrendered KYGR's license to the Federal Communications Commission on July 1, 2021, and the license was cancelled the same day.

References

External links
 

YGR
Radio stations established in 2010
2010 establishments in New Mexico
Defunct radio stations in the United States
Radio stations disestablished in 2021
2021 disestablishments in New Mexico
YGR